Visa requirements for Abkhaz citizens are administrative entry restrictions by the authorities of other states placed on citizens of the Abkhazia. Since Abkhazia is only recognised as a sovereign state by a handful of nations, most countries do not accept Abkhaz passports.

Passport Validity

Visa waiver agreements
Abkhazia has mutual visa-free agreements with Nicaragua, Russia, Tuvalu, Vanuatu, and South Ossetia. Abkhazians can travel to Russia both on the internal (domestic) and foreign passports.

See also

 Abkhazian passport
 List of citizenships refused entry to foreign states
 Visa policy of Abkhazia

References and notes
References

Notes

Abkhazia
Foreign relations of Abkhazia